Jurinea cretacea is a species of flowering plant in the family Asteraceae, native to Ukraine and south European Russia. It is confined to chalk outcrops.

References

Cynareae
Flora of Ukraine
Flora of South European Russia
Plants described in 1841
Taxa named by Alexander von Bunge